Niles West High School, officially Niles Township High School West or NWHS, is a public four-year high school located in Skokie, Illinois, a north suburb of Chicago in the United States. It is part of Niles Township Community High School District 219, which also includes Niles North High School. Its school teams were originally the Indians, but this was later changed in 2001 to the Wolves.  Its feeder middle schools are Lincoln Junior High School (located in Skokie), Fairview South School (located in Skokie), Lincoln Hall Middle School (located in Lincolnwood), Culver Middle School (located in Niles), and Park View School (located in Morton Grove).

History

Niles West High School sits on over an acre of land.  The school opened in the fall of 1958.

In 1996, the Niles Township Federation of Teachers went on a strike for two weeks over negotiations with administrators. During that time numerous students staged a walkout and pledged their allegiance to Niles West. Strikes have also happened in 1979 and 1985 with similar results.

Academics
In 2007, Niles West had an average composite ACT score of 22.3, and graduated 93.2% of its senior class. The average class size was 19.2. In 2012, Newsweek ranked Niles West on its list of the Top 1000 Public Schools in the nation.

As of March 2020, many 8th or 7th graders have been attending Niles West high school as part as an off-level program.

Student life

Activities
The "West Word" student newspaper has been awarded first place for seven years running, with special merit twice, by the American Scholastic Press Association Newspaper contest. Starting in the 2010–2011 school year, the print newspaper was retired, renamed "Niles West News", and moved online.

Fine arts
In April 2007, both Niles West and Niles North received the Kennedy Center Alliance for Arts Education Network and National School Boards Association Award for excellence in arts education.

In summer 2010, the Niles West High School Theatre Department performed at the 2010 American High School Theatre Festival in Scotland.

The Illinois Art Education Association awarded the Fine Arts Departments with three awards in 2020: Art Education Program of the Year, Patti-Anne Ford as the Art and Design Administrator of the Year, and Deanna Sortino as the Secondary Art Educator of the Year.

Athletics
Niles West competes in the Central Suburban League and Illinois High School Association (IHSA). Teams are stylized as the Wolves.

Until the end of the 1999–2000 school year, the sports teams were known as Niles West Indians, a name which was changed to the Wolves so as not to offend Native Americans.

Niles West sponsors interscholastic athletic teams for men and women in basketball, cheerleading, cross country, golf, gymnastics, soccer, water polo, swimming & diving, tennis, track & field, and volleyball.  Men may also compete in baseball and football.  Women can also compete on the wrestling team and may compete in softball.  While not sponsored by the IHSA, the school also sponsors a Poms team for women.

The baseball team has won two IHSA state championships (1971–72 and 1974–75).  The girls' basketball team won the IHSA state championship in 1978-79.

Niles West Men's gymnastics also won the IHSA state championship for men's gymnastics in 2016.

Notable alumni 
 Steven N. Berk, Associate Judge on the Superior Court of the District of Columbia; nominated by Barack Obama
 Arnie Bernstein, nonfiction writer
Bart Conner, International Gymnastics Hall of Fame inductee and Congressional Gold Medal recipient
 Jeffrey Erickson, bank robber
Merrick Garland, 86th Attorney General of the United States, (2021–  )
Kahmora Hall, drag queen and RuPaul's Drag Race contestant
Jim Hart (American football), NFL quarterback (1966-1984), most notably for the St. Louis Cardinals, selected to four Pro Bowls 
Paul Igasaki, former Chief Judge of U.S. Department of Labor's Administrative Review Board
 George Kontos, former San Francisco Giants pitcher and sports commentator for NBC Bay Area
 George Kotsiopoulos, television host, author, and former magazine editor
 John S. Koudounis, CEO of Calamos Investments 
Gary Kremen, founder of Match.com
 Jewell Loyd, a professional basketball player currently playing for the Seattle Storm of the WNBA (league champion, 2018, 2020), Gold Medal, Tokyo 2020 Olympics. Her number 32 retired by Niles West High School.
 Rashard Mendenhall, former football player, Huffington Post contributor, and writer for HBO's Ballers
 George Papadopoulos, policy adviser
 Atour Sargon, Assyrian American activist and politician
Maya Schenwar, editor-in-chief of Truthout and a writer focused on prison-related topics
Rick Singer, mastermind of 2019 college admissions bribery scandal
Todd Sucherman, Styx drummer
Larsa Pippen, American reality television personality, socialite, and businesswoman.

References

External links
 Official website
 District 219 Niles Township High Schools

High schools in Skokie, Illinois
Public high schools in Cook County, Illinois
1959 establishments in Illinois
Educational institutions established in 1959